Galswintha (540–568) was a queen consort of Neustria. She was the daughter of Athanagild, Visigothic king of Hispania (the Iberian Peninsula, comprising modern Spain and Portugal), and Goiswintha.  Galswintha was the sister of Brunhilda, Queen of Austrasia; and the wife of Chilperic I, the Merovingian king of Neustria. Galswintha was likely murdered at the urging of Chilperic's former concubine Fredegund (and then later wife), instigating a 40-year civil war within the Merovingian kingdom.

History
Merovingian king, Chilperic I (561–584), ruled over Neustria, which despite being less extensive in total land as that presided over by his brother King Sigebert, was wealthier since the cities of Paris, Tours, and Rouen all fell under its purview. Chilperic sought Galswintha's hand in marriage after his brother, King Sigebert, had married the noblewoman, Brunhilda (Galswintha's sister), a union that violated the Merovingian tradition of seeking the hand of a lowborn woman instead. Galswintha—daughter of the Visigothic king, Athanagild—was not initially in favor of being betrothed to a northern Frankish king nor was her father, as the Visigoths considered the Franks barbarians. 

To the dismay of her mother, Galswintha was ultimately forced to part with her family on her father's (Athanagild) insistence, who conceded to the marriage; this was likely due to the territorial enticements promised by Chilperic. Once the marriage was agreed, Galswintha was sent away—her escort to Chilperic's side consisted of nobles and warriors from among both the Goths and Franks. Crossing the Pyrenees, Galswintha's journey took her through Narbonne and Carcassonne then onto Poitiers and Tours before reaching Rouen, the location of the marriage arrangement. Pomp and circumstance awaited her upon arrival since Chilperic pulled out all the stops, including having his army pledge allegiance on bended-knee to her as she exited the ship at Rouen.  

Immediately after their betrothal—sometime between 566 and 567—Chilperic gave Galswintha the cities of Limoges, Bordeaux, Cahors, Bearn, and Bigorre as a gift. Chilperic supposedly loved her "dearly" according to Gregory of Tours, but this was most likely due to her substantial dowry. His former concubine Fredegund continued to visit the king's bedchamber, despite Chilperic's proclaimed commitment to Galswintha and to her father Athanagild that he (Chilperic) would respect the Visigothic marriage codes—these charters forbade concubines and mistresses. Galswintha complained bitterly about this betrayal. Still in love with Fredegund, Chilperic allowed himself to be manipulated and had his wealthy wife murdered. Galswintha was apparently strangled. Historian Patrick Geary surmises that Galswintha may also have been murdered as a consequence of Chilperic's fear that she would leave with her dowry. After Galswintha's death, however, the lands—formerly given by Chilperic—ended up being passed on to her sister Brunhilda.

Three days after Galswintha was murdered, Chilperic married Fredegund. Galswintha's untimely death aroused the enmity of her sister Brunhilda; it also set Chilperic's brother Sigebert (Brunhilda's husband) against him and Fredegund, bringing about forty years of conflict between the Frankish kingdoms of Austrasia and Neustria—a veritable Merovingian civil war. When Chilperic was murdered in 584, Brunhilda's anger remained unassuaged, and the conflict following Galswintha's murder continued until Fredegund's death in 597. Beyond this, the result of such antipathy was a three-generation-long feud that essentially "wrecked the Merovingian family" and contributed to the death of ten kings from its line.

Galswintha remains listed in modern genealogical charts demonstrating the links between the Visigothic kingdoms and the Byzantine Empire.

Commemoration in Verse 
The Late Latin poet Venantius Fortunatus wrote a long commemorative poem (Carmina VI.5) in honour of Galswintha, constituting a eulogy of sorts that presented her as a saintly figure and the acts of betrayal and murder within Chilperic's domain as an offense to God himself.

In popular culture 
Symphonic metal band Leaves' Eyes also wrote a song from their album Symphonies of the Night titled "Galswintha".

References

Notes

Citations

Bibliography
 
 
 
 
 
 
 
  

540 births
568 deaths
Frankish queens consort
Merovingian dynasty
Deaths by strangulation
Murdered royalty
Frankish princesses
Arian Christians
6th-century people of the Visigothic Kingdom
6th-century Frankish nobility
Visigothic women
6th-century Frankish women